The oxoglutarate dehydrogenase complex (OGDC) or α-ketoglutarate dehydrogenase complex is an enzyme complex, most commonly known for its role in the citric acid cycle.

Units
Much like pyruvate dehydrogenase complex (PDC), this enzyme forms a complex composed of three components:

Three classes of these multienzyme complexes have been characterized: one specific for pyruvate, a second specific for 2-oxoglutarate, and a third specific for branched-chain α-keto acids.  The oxoglutarate dehydrogenase complex has the same subunit structure and thus uses the same coenzymes as the pyruvate dehydrogenase complex and the branched-chain alpha-keto acid dehydrogenase complex (TTP, CoA, lipoate, FAD and NAD).  Only the E3 subunit is shared in common between the three enzymes.

Properties

Metabolic pathways
This enzyme participates in three different pathways:
 Citric acid cycle (KEGG link: MAP00020)
 Lysine degradation (KEGG link: MAP00310)
 Tryptophan metabolism (KEGG link: MAP00380)

Kinetic properties
The following values are from Azotobacter vinelandii (1):
KM: 0.14 ± 0.04 mM
Vmax : 9 ± 3 μmol.min−1.mg−1

Citric acid cycle

Reaction
The  reaction catalyzed by this enzyme in the citric acid cycle is:
α-ketoglutarate + NAD+ + CoA → Succinyl CoA + CO2 + NADH

This reaction proceeds in three steps: 
 decarboxylation of α-ketoglutarate, 
 reduction of NAD+ to NADH,
 and subsequent transfer to CoA, which forms the end product, succinyl CoA.

ΔG°' for this reaction is -7.2 kcal mol−1.  The energy needed for this oxidation is conserved in the formation of a thioester bond of succinyl CoA.

Regulation
Oxoglutarate dehydrogenase is a key control point in the citric acid cycle. It is inhibited by its products, succinyl CoA and NADH. A high energy charge in the cell will also be inhibitive. ADP and calcium ions are allosteric activators of the enzyme.

By controlling the amount of available reducing equivalents generated by the Krebs cycle, Oxoglutarate dehydrogenase has a downstream regulatory effect on oxidative phosphorylation and ATP production.  Reducing equivalents (such as NAD+/NADH) supply the electrons that run through the electron transport chain of oxidative phosphorylation.  Increased Oxoglutarate dehydrogenase activation levels serve to increase the concentrations of NADH relative to NAD+.  High NADH concentrations stimulate an increase in flux through oxidative phosphorylation.

While an increase in flux through this pathway generates ATP for the cell, the pathway also generates free radical species as a side product, which can cause oxidative stress to the cells if left to accumulate.

Oxoglutarate dehydrogenase is considered to be a redox sensor in the mitochondria, and has an ability to change the functioning level of mitochondria to help prevent oxidative damage.  In the presence of a high concentration of free radical species, Oxoglutarate dehydrogenase undergoes fully reversible free radical mediated inhibition.  In extreme cases, the enzyme can also undergo complete oxidative inhibition.

When mitochondria are treated with excess hydrogen peroxide, flux through the electron transport chain is reduced, and NADH production is halted.  Upon consumption and removal of the free radical source, normal mitochondrial function is restored.

It is believed that the temporary inhibition of mitochondrial function stems from the reversible glutathionylation of the E2-lipoac acid domain of Oxoglutarate dehydrogenase.  Glutathionylation, a form of post-translational modification, occurs during times of increased concentrations of free radicals, and can be undone after hydrogen peroxide consumption via glutaredoxin.  Glutathionylation “protects” the lipoic acid of the E2 domain from undergoing oxidative damage, which helps spare the Oxoglutarate dehydrogenase complex from oxidative stress. 
 
Oxoglutarate dehydrogenase activity is turned off in the presence of free radicals in order to protect the enzyme from damage.  Once free radicals are consumed by the cell, the enzyme’s activity is turned back on via glutaredoxin.  The reduction in activity of the enzyme under times of oxidative stress also serves to slow the flux through the electron transport chain, which slows production of free radicals.

In addition to free radicals and the mitochondrial redox state, Oxoglutarate dehydrogenase activity is also regulated by ATP/ADP ratios,  the ratio of Succinyl-CoA to CoA-SH, and the concentrations of various metal ion cofactors (Mg2+, Ca2+).   Many of these allosteric regulators act at the E1 domain of the enzyme complex, but all three domains of the enzyme complex can be allosterically controlled.  The activity of the enzyme complex is upregulated with high levels of ADP and Pi, Ca2+, and CoA-SH.  The enzyme is inhibited by high ATP levels, high NADH levels, and high Succinyl-CoA concentrations.

Stress response
Oxoglutarate dehydrogenase plays a role in the cellular response to stress.   The enzyme complex undergoes a stress-mediated temporary inhibition upon acute exposure to stress.  The temporary inhibition period sparks a stronger up-regulation response, allowing an increased level of oxoglutarate dehydrogenase activity to compensate for the acute stress exposure.  Acute exposures to stress are usually at lower, tolerable levels for the cell.

Pathophysiologies can arise when the stress becomes cumulative or develops into chronic stress.  The up-regulation response that occurs after acute exposure can become exhausted if the inhibition of the enzyme complex becomes too strong.  Stress in cells can cause a deregulation in the biosynthesis of the neurotransmitter glutamate.  Glutamate toxicity in the brain is caused by a buildup of glutamate under times of stress.  If oxoglutarate dehydrogenase activity is dysfunctional (no adaptive stress compensation), the build-up of glutamate cannot be fixed, and brain pathologies can ensue.  Dysfunctional oxoglutarate dehydrogenase may also predispose the cell to damage from other toxins that can cause neurodegeneration.

Pathology
2-Oxo-glutarate dehydrogenase is an autoantigen recognized in primary biliary cirrhosis, a form of acute liver failure. These antibodies appear to recognize oxidized protein that has resulted from inflammatory immune responses. Some of these inflammatory responses are explained by gluten sensitivity. Other mitochondrial autoantigens include pyruvate dehydrogenase and branched-chain alpha-keto acid dehydrogenase complex, which are antigens recognized by anti-mitochondrial antibodies.

Activity of the 2-oxoglutarate dehydrogenase complex is decreased in many neurodegenerative diseases.  Alzheimer's disease, Parkinson's disease, Huntington disease, and supranuclear palsy  are all associated with an increased oxidative stress level in the brain.  Specifically for Alzheimer Disease patients, the activity of Oxoglutarate dehydrogenase is significantly diminished.  This leads to a possibility that the portion of the TCA cycle responsible for causing the build-up of free radical species in the brain of patients is a malfunctioning Oxoglutarate dehydrogenase complex.  The mechanism for disease-related inhibition of this enzyme complex remains relatively unknown.

References

Further reading

External links 
 

EC 1.2.4
Autoantigens
Citric acid cycle